Wolfchant is a metal band formed in St. Oswald, Germany in August 2003 by Lokhi, Gaahnt, Skaahl, and Norgahd. Wolfchant's lyrics deal with legends and folk tales from Nordic mythology. In August 2005 they signed a contract with CCP Records, managed by Caleb Murrell-Smith. With the first full-length album Bloody Tales of Disgraced Lands (2005) the band gained supra-regional respect.

In February 2007 Nattulv became a member of Wolfchant after former bass guitar Gaahnt quit the band for family reasons. Nattulv was replaced by Bahznar, for their album Determined Damnation, which was released in April 2009.

The band made a guest appearance in the Aqua Teen Hunger Force episode "Totem Pole", which aired in 2012.

Current line up
 Lokhi (Mario Lokhi Möginger) – vocals
 Skaahl (Mario Liebl) – lead guitar
 Nortwin (Michael Seifert) – clean vocals
 Sertorius (Stephan Tannreuther) – bass guitar
 Lug (Thomas Schmidt) – drums

Discography

 The Fangs of the Southern Death (2004)
 The Herjan Trilogy (EP) (2004)
 Bloody Tales of Disgraced Lands (2005)
 A Pagan Storm (2007)
 Determined Damnation (2009)
 Call Of The Black Winds (2011)
 Embraced by Fire (2013)
 Bloodwinter (2017)
Omega: Bestia (2021)

External links

 
 Wolfchant at Massacre Records

German heavy metal musical groups
German musical groups
Musical groups established in 2003